P. E. S. College of Engineering (PESCE, standing for "People's Education Society College of Engineering") is an autonomous institute and technical engineering college located in Mandya, Karnataka, India. Established in 1962, it is run by the People's Education Trust. It is an autonomous institute from the year 2008 under Visvesvaraya Technological University, Belgaum and is recognized by AICTE.

Rankings

The National Institutional Ranking Framework (NIRF) ranked it 137 among engineering colleges in 2022.

References

External links
 

Affiliates of Visvesvaraya Technological University
Engineering colleges in Karnataka
Academic institutions formerly affiliated with the University of Mysore
Educational institutions established in 1962
Universities and colleges in Mandya district